Kernan (also Otter Creek) is an unincorporated community in LaSalle County, Illinois, United States.

Notes

Unincorporated communities in LaSalle County, Illinois
Unincorporated communities in Illinois